Canadian Pacific 1286 is a preserved G5d class 4-6-2 "Pacific" type steam locomotive built in 1948 by the Canadian Locomotive Company. It was sold to George Hart, who used it to pull excursion trains in the 1960s. It was eventually sold again to Jack Showalter, who operated it on his Allegany Central Railroad from the early 1970s to the late 1990s. As of 2023, No. 1286 is stored under private ownership at the Prairie Dog Central Railway, waiting for eventual restoration.

History

Revenue service 
No. 1286 was constructed in June 1948 by the Canadian Locomotive Company in Kingston, Ontario as the fifteenth member of the Canadian Pacific Railway's (CPR) G5d class. It was initially assigned to pull passenger trains and commuter trains throughout Alberta and British Columbia. As steam locomotives were being replaced by diesel locomotives on the CPR, No. 1286 served as an emergency backup locomotive, until it was retired in 1959.

Early preservation 
After sitting in storage for five years, No. 1286 was purchased directly from the CPR in 1964 by former Reading Company employee George M. Hart, who founded Rail Tours Incorporated to host several steam excursion trains throughout the Northeastern United States. No. 1286 was restored in 1965, and it began pulling tours on the Maryland and Pennsylvania Railroad (MPA) in York County alongside other steam locomotives, including CPR G5c No. 1238, CPR 4-6-0 No. 972, and Reading 0-6-0st No. 1251. During the first few weeks of excursion service, however, No. 1286 was pulling a train between York and Yoe on the MPA, when it derailed on the outside of a wide curve, causing its cowcatcher to be bent underneath while resting on the outside rail. One night prior to this, a heavy thunderstorm hit York County, and a large pile of gravel and dirt was formed on a crossing along a farm lane. A diesel locomotive was brought in to help rerail No. 1286, which subsequently returned to service in spite of its bent cowcatcher. The following year, it began pulling trains on mainlines owned by class 1 railroads. On some occasions, No. 1286 pulled a series of roundtrip excursion runs on the Western Maryland (WM) mainline between York, Williamsport, Hagerstown, and Cumberland, and it was accompanied by CPR No. 972 during some of the trips.

Beginning in 1967, Ross E. Rowland, who founded the High Iron Company (HICO), loaned Nos 1286 and 1238 from Hart to pull his own excursion trains over the Central Railroad of New Jersey's (CNJ) mainline between Jersey City, New Jersey and Wilkes-Barre, Pennsylvania. In early February 1968, however, the boilers at the Reading Steam Heat and Power Company had broken down, resulting in the city of Reading to lose power and warmth for many of their buildings and districts. Hart had loaned both of his G5s to the city, so that their boilers would supply heated steam for the city while the plant's own boilers were under repairs. With Nos 1286 and 1238 temporarily out of commission, Rowland had loaned fellow CPR G5d No. 1278 from Steamtown, U.S.A. and Great Western 2-10-0 No. 90 from the Strasburg Rail Road to pull the doubleheaded excursion trains he had hosted that same month.

Once the plant's boilers were fully repaired, Hart removed both locomotives from the city on February 7. Rowland continued to use Nos 1286 and 1238 to pull more excursion trains he had hosted, including the Wilkes-Barre Limited between Wilkes-Barre and Newark, and they were still owned by Hart until August 1968. With Hart losing sentiment to keep his G5 locomotives, he sold both of them to the Historic Red Clay Valley Railway Equipment and Leasing Company, which leased them to Rowland, so that he would further use them for his tours. His crews subsequently modified No. 1286 to have its coiled elesco feedwater heater removed from its smokebox to give it a more identical appearance to 1238.

On May 18, 1969, Nos 1286 and 1238 pulled a doubleheaded twenty-car excursion train from Baltimore, Maryland to Harrisburg, Pennsylvania over two Penn Central branch lines for the Baltimore Chapter of the National Railway Historical Society (NRHS). The trip, however, was plagued with various mechanical issues. The fireman who was in control of No. 1286 that day allowed the fire inside the firebox to burn through one of the fire grates, causing the locomotive to lose steam pressure. With No. 1238 having running gear problems, No. 1286 pulled the train to Harrisburg unassisted, in spite of its firebox issues. After a photo session took place at the station, a Penn Central diesel locomotive was coupled in front of the two G5s to pull the train back to Baltimore after dawn. After repairs were made to the locomotives, Rowland began to use them separately, and it became less and less common for them to pull his trains. By 1973, No. 1286 was no longer in service for HICO.

Jack Showalter ownership 
In 1973, No. 1286 was purchased along with No. 1238 by Jack Showalter, and he moved both locomotives to Covington, Virginia to be extensively overhauled. Showalter was the founder of the Alleghany Central Railroad (ACRR), which was a fifteen-mile tourist railroad that originally lied over the Chesapeake and Ohio Railway's (C&O) Hot Springs branch between Intervale and Covington. Crews repaired No. 1286's bent cowcatcher during its overhaul and repaint. The locomotive was brought back under steam in 1975, and it began pulling tourist trains at fifteen miles per hour along a tributary of the James River. On one occasion, an ex-Chicago, Burlington and Quincy office car derailed after dawn with several ACRR crews off duty, so Showalter gathered two railfans and some of his friends to help him rerail it, using chunks of wood, and No. 1286 was used to push the car back. After the 1984 operating season, however, the ACRR was forced to vacate the Hot Springs branch after ownership disputes took place, and the branch was subsequently ripped up.

In 1988, Showalter approached the Scenic Railroad Development Corporation (SRDC), who agreed to allow the ACRR, who changed their name to the Allegany Central Railroad, to use their newly restored trackage, which was formerly operated by the WM. After Showalter's equipment was moved to Ridgeley, West Virginia, the ACRR began operations in 1989 to host trains from Cumberland, Maryland through the Allegheny Mountains to Frostburg, Maryland and back. Since No. 1286 was due for an overhaul, it was undergoing repairs in Ridgeley, and it didn't return to service until May 1990. No. 1286 pulled the last train the ACRR hosted on the Cumberland line on December 8, 1990, before Showalter and the SRDC ran into ownership disputes that prevented them from renewing their leasing contract. The SRDC subsequently changed their name to the Western Maryland Scenic Railroad to begin operating their own trains with their own locomotives, such as Lake Superior and Ishpeming 2-8-0 No. 34, and eventually, C&O 2-6-6-2 No. 1309.

By 1992, No. 1286 was moved along with the rest of the ACRR's equipment to Gordonsville, Virginia for temporary storage, while Showalter was in search for a new home for his equipment. On October 23, 1993, No. 1286 lead a tripleheader in front of No. 1238 and EMD gp9 No. 40 to pull the ACRR's equipment to Staunton over the CSX mainline, but not before the ACRR further changed their name to the Virginia Central Railroad (VCRR). Subsequently, No. 1286 lead two doubleheaded excursion trains on October 30 and 31, with the first train running between Charlottesville and Clifton Forge and the second train running between Charlottesville and Gordonsville. The following month, however, CSX began rising the insurance costs, and Showalter could no longer afford to run his trains on their mainline trackage. No. 1286's last run occurred in October 1997 before it was put into storage on the Shenandoah Valley Railroad (SVRR), with Showalter living inside a camping trailer to protect his equipment from vandals. In 2004, No. 1286 was moved to Verona to be stored while covered with tarps. In November 2014, Showalter had passed away.

Disposition 
After Showalter's passing, his equipment was auctioned off as part of a liquidation sale, and in 2015, No. 1286 was purchased with No. 1238 by a private owner from Alberta. In July of that year, the locomotive was towed back to Staunton to be lifted onto a flatcar with its tender on a separate car with No. 1238's tender, and it was subsequently moved on the CSX mainline before it interchanged with the CPR to be hauled to Manitoba. On September 13, No. 1286 arrived in Winnipeg, and as it was lifed off of the flatcar, it touched Canadian soil for the first time since it was sold to Hart in 1964. As of 2023, No. 1286 is still stored under private ownership in Winnipeg without any confirmed plans to bring the locomotive back to service on the horizon.

Film history 

 No. 1286's last run under Showalter ownership occurred on October 31, 1997. It was fired up that day while being fitted with a fake diamand smokestack specifically to be filmed in Staunton for the 1998 Hallmark Hall of Fame film The Love Letter, which starred Campbell Scott, Jennifer Jason Leigh, and David Dukes, and it was directed by Dan Curtis.

Surviving sister engines 

 No. 1201 is currently on static display inside the Canada Science and Technology Museum in Ottawa, Ontario in Canada.
 No. 1238 is currently with No. 1286 in storage at the Prairie Dog Central Railway in Winnipeg, Manitoba in Canada.
 No. 1246 is currently in storage at the Railroad Museum of New England in Thomaston, Connecticut in the United States.
 No. 1278 is currently on static display at the Age of Steam Roundhouse in Sugarcreek, Ohio in the United States.
 No. 1293 is currently on display at the Age of Steam Roundhouse in Sugarcreek, Ohio in the United States, waiting for a rebuild.

References

Bibliography 

CLC locomotives
4-6-2 locomotives
1286
Individual locomotives of Canada
Preserved steam locomotives of Canada
Railway locomotives introduced in 1948
Passenger locomotives
Standard gauge locomotives of Canada